The Tonight Show Band is usually the name used by the current house band on NBC's late night talk show The Tonight Show. It may refer to:

The Tonight Show Band with Doc Severinsen
Kevin Eubanks and The Tonight Show Band
Max Weinberg and The Tonight Show Band
Rickey Minor and The Tonight Show Band
The Roots, the current band for The Tonight Show Starring Jimmy Fallon, but not formally called "The Tonight Show Band"